Nicolas-Étienne Framery (25 March 1745, Rouen – 26 November 1810, Paris) was a French music theorist, critic and lyric writer associated with opera, especially opéra comique. He wrote and adapted librettos. His work became more academic and abstract and he eventually became surintendant de la musique for the Comte d'Artois, (who would become Charles X of France).

Works 

1700: Airs détachés de L'Olympiade, ou, Le triomphe de l'amitié : drame héroïque représenté par les Comédiens italiens au mois d'octobre 1777
1765: Ariettes détachées de Nanette et Lucas ou La Païsanne curieuse : comédie en un acte avec accompagnement de basse ou clavecin représentée à la Comédie Italienne, La Chevardiere
1796: Avis aux poëtes lyriques, ou De la nécessité du rythme et de la césure dans les hymnes ou odes destinés à la musique, Imprimerie de la République, Brumaire
1788: Calendrier musical universel, contenant l'indication des cérémonies d'église en musique les découvertes et les anecdotes de l'année... la notice des pièces en musique représentées... &c. &c. &c. Pour l'année 1788, Prault
1790: De l'organisation des spectacles de Paris, ou essai sur leur forme actuelle; sur les moyens de l'améliorer, Buisson
1802: Discours qui a remporté le prix de musique et déclamation proposé par la Classe de littérature et beaux-arts de l'institut national de France, et décerné dans sa séance du 15 nivôse, an X, sur cette question : Analyser les rapports qui existent entre la musique et la déclamation ; – déterminer les moyens d'appliquer la déclamation à la musique, sans nuire à la mélodie, C. Pougens
1772–1776: Diverses lettres de Gluck
1791–1818: Encyclopédie méthodique. Musique, Charles-Joseph Panckoucke ; Agasse, 1980–1989
1824: Jérusalem délivrée, Panckoucke
1785: L'enfer, poëme du Dante, traduction nouvelle, Mercure de France, June
1770: L'Indienne ; one-act comedy mingled with ariettes, premiered by the Comédiens Italiens ordinaires du roi, Thursday 31 October, Veuve Duchesne, 1771
1783: L'infante de Zamora, three-act comedy mingled with ariettes, parodied on the music by la Frascatana, del Signor Paesielo, Ruault
1777: L'Olympiade, ou Le triomphe de l'Amitié, drame héroïque in three acts and in verse, mingled with music. Premiered by the Comédiens Italiens ordinaires du Roi, 2 October and at Fontainebleau, devant leurs majestés, 24th of the same month. La musique du sieur Sacchini, Veuve Duchesne
1775: La Colonie, two-act opéra comique, imitated from Italian and parodied on the music del Sgr. Sacchini. Premiered by the Comédiens italiens, 16 August, Veuve Duchesne, 1775
1783: La sorcière par hasard, opéra comique in verse mingled with music; premiered by the Comédiens Italiens ordinaires du Roy Thursday 3 7bre, Houbaut
1700: L'ariette du jour : Le triomphe de l'amitié
1750: Le Barbier de Séville, four-act opéra comique, set on music on the Italian translation, Made Baillon, 1784
1752: Le Miroir magique, one-act opéra comique, premiered at the Théâtre de la foire S. Laurent, 1 September, Duchesne, 1753
1786: Le musicien pratique ou, Leçons qui conduisent les élèves dans l'art du contrepoint, en leur enseignant la manière de composer correctement toute espèce de musique : ouvrage composé dans les principes des conservatoires d'Italie, par il Signor Francesco Azopardi maître de chapelle de Malthe. Translated from Italian by M. Framery, Le Duc, 1786 ; University of Rochester Press, 1957
1768: Les deux comtesses, opéra-bouffon, imitated from Italian and parodied on the music by the famous signor Paisiello, Le Duc
1768: Les Trois nations : contes nationaux, London ; Veuve Duchesne
1780: L'Infante de Zamora, three-act opéra comique mingled with ariettes, parodied under the music by La Frascatana du célèbre Sgr. Paisiello, Le Duc
1777: L'Olympiade, ou Le triomphe de l'amitié, drame héroïque in three acts and in verse mingled with music ; premiered by the les Comédiens Italiens ordinaires du roi, 2 October, & à Fontainebleau, devant Leurs Majestés, le 24 du même mois, Paris, Basset
1770: Mémoires de M. le marquis de S. Forlaix : recueillis dans les lettres de sa famille, Fétil
1791: Musique, Panckoucke; New York, Da Capo Press, 1971
1764: Nanette et Lucas, ou La paysanne curieuse, one-act comedy in prose mingled with ariettes with a bass or harpsichord accompaniment presented at the Comédie Italienne, Hérissant
1764: Nanette et Lucas : ou La paysanne curieuse, one-act comedy in prose mingled with ariettes, premiered by the Comédiens italiens 14 June ; music by M. le chevalier d'Herbain, C. Harissant, 1764
1768: Nicaise, opéra-comique, Veuve Duchesne
1810: Notice sur Joseph Haydn, associé étranger de l'Institut de France : contenant quelques particularités de sa vie privée, relatives à sa personne ou à ses ouvrages, Barba
1783: Renaud, three-act tragédie lyrique, premiered by the Académie de musique Tuesday 25 February, Le Duc ; New York, Broude, 1971
1791: Réponse des auteurs dramatiques, soussignés, à la pétition présentée à l'Assemblée nationale par des directeurs de spectacle, Du Pont
1787: Roland furieux, poème héroïque de l'Arioste, Plassan
1785: Tablettes de renommée des musiciens, auteurs, compositeurs, virtuoses, amateurs et maîtres de musique vocale et instrumentale, les plus connus en chaque genre : avec une notice des ouvrages aux autres motifs qui les ont rendus recommandables, Cailleau

 Notes 

 Sources 
 Théodore-Éloi Lebreton, Biographie rouennaise'', Rouen, Le Brument, 1865, (pp. 149–151).

External links 
Nicolas-Étienne Framery on Data.bnf.fr

1745 births
1810 deaths
18th-century French dramatists and playwrights
18th-century French poets
18th-century French male writers
French opera librettists
French translators
Italian–French translators
Writers from Rouen
French classical composers
French male classical composers
18th-century French translators